Anna Cláudia Protásio Monteiro (born June 3, 1975), known professionally as Cacau Protásio, is a Brazilian actress and comedian.

Filmography

References

External links

1975 births
Living people
People from Campos dos Goytacazes
Brazilian television actresses
Brazilian telenovela actresses